Laddie Lewis (born 1915, date of death unknown) was a Guyanese cyclist. He competed in three events at the 1948 Summer Olympics.

References

External links
 

1915 births
Year of death missing
Guyanese male cyclists
Olympic cyclists of British Guiana
Cyclists at the 1948 Summer Olympics
Place of birth missing